Matthias Flach may refer to:

 Matthias Flach (mathematician)
 Matthias Flach (rower)